The Indian deepwater dragonet (Callionymus carebares) is a species of dragonet native to the western Indian Ocean where it occurs at depths of from .  This species grows to a length of  TL.

References 

C
Fish described in 1890